Raijin may refer to :

Raijin (雷神), also known as Kaminari-sama (雷様), Raiden-sama (雷電様), Narukami (鳴る神) and Raikou (雷公),  a god of lightning, thunder and storms in Japanese mythology and the Shinto religion.
Akira Raijin, (川畑 顕, Kawabata Akira) (born July 17, 1978), a Japanese professional wrestler
Raijin Comics, a manga anthology published in North America by the now-defunct Gutsoon! Entertainment 
Raijin (雷神), ring name of Sho Tanaka,  a Japanese professional wrestler 
Raijin, a character in Final Fantasy VIII
Raijin-2, a microsatellite

See also
Raijū, (雷獣, "thunder animal" or "thunder beast"), a legendary creature from Japanese mythology.